The Jupagalk or Jupagulk are an Aboriginal people of northern Victoria, Australia. They may have been a Wergaia clan.

Language
The language of the Jupagalk was related to Jaara, according to remarks by Alfred William Howitt, as interpreted by Norman Tindale.

Country
Their southern boundary ended around Charlton. They extended west of Kerang, and southwest towards Lake Buloke. The northern frontier lay beyond Towaninnie.

Social organization
The Jupagalk tribe was composed of several clans.

Alternative names
 Jambajamba  (jamba  means 'no')
 Mallenjerrick  ("people of the mallee").
 Towanninny
 Yamba, Yambayamba
 Yow-ew-nil-lurn
 Yuppila, Yupa-galk-wournditch  ("people of the native box (Bursaria spinosa) country")

See also 
 Wotjobaluk, Jaadwa, Jadawadjali, Wergaia and Jupagulk Peoples v Victoria

Notes

Citations

Sources

Aboriginal peoples of Victoria (Australia)
History of Victoria (Australia)